Jonathan Paiement (born March 7, 1985) is a Canadian professional ice hockey defenceman. He is currently playing in Austria with HC Innsbruck of the Austrian National League. Paiement was selected by the New York Rangers in the eighth round (247th overall) of the 2004 NHL Entry Draft.

Amateur career
Paiement played major junior hockey in the Quebec Major Junior Hockey League.

Professional career
Paiement's first professional season was played in the ECHL with the 2006–07 Texas Wildcatters.

On February 19, 2009, Paiement and four other people were seriously injured when the bus carrying the Albany River Rats home from a game in Lowell, Massachusetts struck a guard rail and rolled on its side on the Massachusetts Turnpike. Paiement, Nicolas Blanchard, Joe Jensen, Casey Borer, and the River Rats' radio color commentator, John Hennessy, were all taken to Berkshire Medical Center in Pittsfield with "serious" injuries.

Awards and honours

Career statistics

References

External links

1985 births
Living people
Albany River Rats players
Augsburger Panther players
Canadian ice hockey defencemen
Florida Everblades players
French Quebecers
Hershey Bears players
Lewiston Maineiacs players
New York Rangers draft picks
Rockford IceHogs (AHL) players
Sherbrooke Castors players
Ice hockey people from Montreal
Texas Wildcatters players
Canadian expatriate ice hockey players in Germany